Florence Gertrude Horsbrugh, Baroness Horsbrugh, GBE, PC (13 October 1889 – 6 December 1969) was a Scottish Unionist Party and Conservative Party politician. The historian Kenneth Baxter has argued "in her day... [she] was arguably the best known woman MP in the UK". and that she was "arguably the most successful female Conservative parliamentarian until Margaret Thatcher".

Education 
She was educated at Lansdowne House (Edinburgh), St Hilda's (Folkestone), and Mills College (California).

Career 

During the First World War, Horsbrugh pioneered a travelling kitchen scheme in Chelsea, London, which gained sufficient renown as to warrant an invitation to bring the kitchen to Buckingham Palace one lunch hour to entertain Queen Mary, who approved particularly of the sweets.

Horsbrugh was a Member of Parliament (MP) for Dundee from 1931 until her defeat in 1945. Her victory in 1931 was a surprising result, and she was the first woman to represent the city in the House of Commons and the first Conservative to be elected as a Member of Parliament for Dundee since the city gained its own constituency in 1832. At the time of her election, Dundee had not yet elected a female councillor. In 1936 she became the first woman to move the Address in reply to the King's Speech, following which she was interviewed for television, in the process becoming the first member of parliament to appear on that medium. 

She unsuccessfully contested Midlothian and Peebles in 1950 and was elected in the delayed poll at Manchester Moss Side, sitting from 1950 until her retirement in 1959. Upon retirement, she was elevated to the House of Lords, as a life peer with the title Baroness Horsbrugh, of Horsbrugh in the County of Peebles, where she sat until her death.

She held ministerial office in the wartime coalition governments as Parliamentary Secretary to the Ministry of Health (1939–45), and Parliamentary Secretary to the Ministry of Food (1945). She was only the second woman to hold a ministerial post in a Conservative-led government following Katherine, Duchess of Atholl. 

As Parliamentary Secretary to the Minister of Health, 1939–45, she was responsible for arranging the evacuation of schoolchildren from major cities during the war. Following her return to the House of Commons, she was the first woman to hold a Cabinet post in a Conservative government, and only the third woman, after Bondfield and Wilkinson to be appointed as a Cabinet minister in British history (1953–1954), having been appointed Minister of Education in 1951. She also served as a delegate to the Council of Europe and Western European Union from 1955 to 1960.

As part of her lifelong championing of social welfare issues, Horsbrugh took a marked interest in child welfare and introduced, as a private member, the bill which became the Adoption of Children (Regulation) Act 1939. Horsbrugh also carried out a great deal of preparatory work on the scheme which eventually became the National Health Service.

In 1945, she was a British delegate to the San Francisco Conference which established the United Nations.

Awards 
Horsbrugh was appointed MBE in 1920, promoted to CBE in 1939, and to GBE in 1954. She was appointed a Privy Counsellor in the 1945 New Years Honours List.

Horsbrugh was an awarded an LL.D by the University member and was also an honorary Fellow of the Royal College of Surgeons of Edinburgh.

Sport 

Baxter relates that Horsbrugh surprised a sports reporter who found her attending Dundee and Dundee United football matches during the 1935 election campaign. However she was a football fan and apparently supported Hearts.

Notes

References

External links 
 
The Papers of Florence Horsbrugh, Baroness Horsbrugh are held at the Churchill Archives Centre in Cambridge and are accessible to the public.
Photos of Florence Horsbrugh's First World War Kitchens scrapbook and scrapbooks on her political life
Remembering Florence Horsbrugh on International Women's Day

1889 births
1969 deaths
20th-century Scottish women politicians
20th-century Scottish politicians
Anglo-Scots
British Secretaries of State for Education
Conservative Party (UK) MPs for English constituencies
Conservative Party (UK) life peers
Dames Grand Cross of the Order of the British Empire
Female members of the Cabinet of the United Kingdom
Female members of the Parliament of the United Kingdom for English constituencies
Female members of the Parliament of the United Kingdom for Scottish constituencies
Members of the Parliament of the United Kingdom for Dundee constituencies
Members of the Parliament of the United Kingdom for constituencies in Lancashire
Members of the Privy Council of the United Kingdom
Ministers in the Chamberlain peacetime government, 1937–1939
Ministers in the Chamberlain wartime government, 1939–1940
Ministers in the Churchill caretaker government, 1945
Ministers in the Churchill wartime government, 1940–1945
Ministers in the third Churchill government, 1951–1955
People associated with Dundee
Place of birth missing
UK MPs 1931–1935
UK MPs 1935–1945
UK MPs 1950–1951
UK MPs 1951–1955
UK MPs 1955–1959
UK MPs who were granted peerages
Unionist Party (Scotland) MPs
20th-century English women
20th-century English people
Life peeresses created by Elizabeth II